Ernest Salt (10 February 1897–1940) was an English footballer who played in the Football League for Accrington Stanley, Everton and Wigan Borough.

References

1897 births
1940 deaths
English footballers
Association football goalkeepers
English Football League players
Walsall F.C. players
Everton F.C. players
Accrington Stanley F.C. (1891) players
Wigan Borough F.C. players